Slătioarele may refer to several villages in Romania:

 Slătioarele, a village in Băbana Commune, Argeș County
 Slătioarele, a village in Jilavele Commune, Ialomiţa County
 Slătioarele, a village in Ocnele Mari Commune, Vâlcea County